The Ibáñez River is a river of Chile located in the Aysén del General Carlos Ibáñez del Campo Region. It has its origin in the skirts of Hudson volcano and flows south-east through the Andes into the General Carrera Lake. The river borders the south side of Cerro Castillo National Reserve, home to Cerro Castillo.

Puerto Ingeniero Ibáñez is located close to the mouth of the river.

See also
List of rivers of Chile

References

Rivers of Chile
Rivers of Aysén Region